Sheerness is an unincorporated community in southern Alberta within Special Area No. 2, located  east of Highway 36,  north of Brooks.

The community most likely takes its name from Sheerness, in England.

The community was named by Mr. George Crozier in memory of a seaport town on the east coast of England. The first postmistress was Mrs. Margaret Crozier in 1909.

References 

Localities in Special Area No. 2